The 2012 President's Cup (Maldives) Final was the 62nd Final of the Maldives President's Cup.

Route to the final

Match

Details

Statistics

See also
2012 President's Cup (Maldives)

References

President's Cup (Maldives) finals
Pres